William Manning Lowe (June 12, 1842 – October 12, 1882) was an American politician who served the state of Alabama in the U.S. House of Representatives between 1879 and 1881 and in 1882. He was born on June 12, 1842, in Huntsville, Alabama. He attended the Wesleyan University at Florence, Alabama and the University of Virginia. During the American Civil War he enlisted in the Confederate States Army, eventually rising to the rank of lieutenant colonel. He studied law, was admitted to the bar, and practiced in Huntsville. He was solicitor of the fifth judicial circuit between 1865 and 1867. In 1870, he was elected to the Alabama House of Representatives, and was a delegate to the Alabama constitutional convention of 1875.

Lowe was elected in 1878 as a Greenback to the U.S. House of Representatives, but in initial results was defeated for reelection by Joseph Wheeler in 1880, 601 votes for Lowe having been declared illegal by election judges. In a highly contentious recount that lasted over a year, Lowe successfully contested Wheeler's election and assumed the office on June 3, 1882. Lowe, however, only served four months, and died of tuberculosis at his home in Huntsville on October 12, 1882. He was buried in Maple Hill Cemetery in Huntsville. Wheeler won a special election and served the remaining weeks of the term.

See also 
 List of United States Congress members who died in office (1790–1899)

Notes

References 
 
 Lawley, Jim.  The Decatur Daily, December 10, 2000, online edition (retrieved July 14, 2001).
 http://www.newspaperabstracts.com/link.php?action=detail&id=30888

External links

1842 births
1882 deaths
Politicians from Huntsville, Alabama
Lawyers from Huntsville, Alabama
Military personnel from Huntsville, Alabama
American people of English descent
Greenback Party members of the United States House of Representatives from Alabama
Members of the Alabama House of Representatives
Alabama lawyers
19th-century American lawyers
Confederate States Army officers
People of Alabama in the American Civil War
19th-century deaths from tuberculosis
Tuberculosis deaths in Alabama